The Prosecutor's office of the Autonomous Republic of Crimea - is a State Government Body. According to the Constitution and the Ukrainian Law, its functions at the Autonomous Republic of Crimea are prosecution, representation, supervision and control. According to the Acting Prosecutor General's decree No33 dated June 12, 2014, the Prosecutor's office of the Autonomous Republic of Crimea was temporarily relocated to Kyiv.

History 
The first prosecutor of the Crimean peninsula was Court Counsellor Dmytro Lesli. His name is mentioned in documents dated 1785. It was the period of Catherine the Great's rule when the government reorganization was held and the regional prosecutors and arbitrators were appointed.

The first prosecutors remained on the position till the end of 1788 and were succeeded by Oleksandr Taranov-Belozerov. Taranov-Belozerov was appointed on 13 December 1788 and remained in the position for 5 years. The next regional prosecutor of Crimea was Mykhailo Tarnavskii. He was appointed on 30 June 1803 when the Tavriya region was established. The prosecutor of Tavriya region performed the supervision over observance of laws in the enforcement of court judgments delivered in criminal cases, as well as in the application of other coercive measures related to the restraint of individual personal liberty.
At the Crimean Public Record Office, there are notes about the following prosecutors of Crimea: Fabr, Semen Mayer, Stanislav Borovsky, Oleksandr Glukhov. In April 1869 the position of Tavriya region prosecutor was annihilated according to the Court Reform of 1864. Later the functions of the Tavriya region prosecutor were held to the Prosecutor of Simferopol District Court.

The District Court of Simferopol consisted of two houses and began its work on 22 April 1869 after the issue of the Senate's decree dated 5 July 1868.  According to that decree prosecutor of the Simferopol District Court was guided by the Ministry of Justice and the prosecutor of Odessa Court of Justice.

The District Court of Simferopol consisted of the Head, the Deputies and the Members also under the governance of the Court there were the Prosecutor, the Detective and the Notary. According to the Court regulations, the Prosecutor was the accusatorial body of the State and at the same time, the supervision was also executed by the Prosecutor.
At the Public Record Office, there are notes about the following prosecutors of the District Court of Simferopol from its establishment till the abolition in 1920. They were: Boris Vitte, Mykola Domchynskii, Novytskii, Felix Zivert, Umanskii. There are also evidences that under the supervision of the Prosecutor Felix Zivert there were nearly eleven prosecution attorneys.

One of the first steps of newly declared the Autonomous Soviet Socialist Republic of Crimea was the establishment of the local bodies of Justice. The new Prosecution Supervision Body began its work on September 16, 1922, as a part of State Justice Body and consisted of the Prosecutor, two deputies (responsible for the criminal and the civilian cases) and the department of public prosecution.

The year 1923 was very important – on 1 June the Main Governing Body of Russia had implemented on its territory the Criminal Code which inferred to the establishment of the State Prosecution as a part of Ministry of Justice.

The State Prosecution Service should perform the following functions: supervision over observance of laws by the authorities, public organizations and individuals; direct supervision over the bodies carrying out detective operations, inquiries and pre-trial investigation; supporting the prosecution in courts on behalf of the State. During this period İsmail Firdevs was the Prosecutor of the Autonomous Soviet Socialist Republic of Crimea and under his control, there were State Prosecution Service, two deputies, the prosecutors of regional courts, the prosecutors of Sevastopol and Simferopol regional courts.

There are several names of the prosecutors of the ASSR of Crimea that could be found in historical sources: Reshid Nagayev, Osman Berikov, Plinokos, Sofu, Memeth Emir-Saliev. 
In 1936 the system of Prosecution Service was finally and totally centralized and passed under the jurisdiction of the Prosecutor General of the USSR. 
Starting February 1941 the head of the Prosecution Service of ASSR of Crimea was Mykhailo Zolotov. When the Crimean peninsula was occupied by the German troops in November 1941, the work of the prosecution Service was stopped until 4 October 1943 when it was renewed in Krasnodar where the Prosecutor of the ASSR of Crimea (Chekalov) had been relocated together with his deputies and the heads of Divisions (Norden and Korkin).

On January 3d 1942 Mykola Chekalov was the prosecutor of the ASSR of Crimea for five years. In 1944 when Simferopol was free again Chekalov returned to the city and renewed the work of the prosecutor's office. On April 22, 1944 twenty-one of former participants of war began their work at the prosecutor's office. Very soon the prosecution started to perform its main duty – to protect the Socialist law and public property. At that time the prosecution consisted of six divisions: investigation, сriminal-judicial, investigation of extremely grave crimes, general supervision, supervision under the police.  Supervision under the places of detention was performed by the prosecutor's assistant. The secret division was detached into the special sector.

Under the direct management of the prosecutor of the ASSR of Crimea there were 5 city prosecutor's offices, 27 regional prosecutions, and 9 regional prosecutions of cities – Kerch, Sevastopol and Simferopol.

When in June 1945 the ASSR of Crimea had lost its particular status (Autonomous), the prosecution was renamed into the prosecutor's office of Crimean region. In 1947 the new position was established – the prosecutor's assistant dealing with crimes against minors.
The Division of Investigation began its work in 1978. In 1980 the Regional Prosecution Board was established. The period between 1950s and 1980s was rather stable and during this period there were only three prosecutors: Mykola Khlamov was the head of prosecution for eight years (September 1949 – May 1957), Iliya Konoplev had been on the position for 7 years (May 1957 – July 1964), and for the next twenty years Mykola Korneev was the head of the Crimean prosecution (July 1964 – July 1984).

The 1990s were the years of significant reforms in the work of the Prosecution. That was the time of resonant economic crimes, the investigations were held with the part of the detective and later the prosecutor of the Crimean Republic – Valentyn Kuptsov. 
In 1990 the operational situation in Crimea got much worse: almost daily there were shots and people died, a lot of powerful criminal groups appeared, the largest of which had 50-60 members.

This criminal situation was fixed when in 1996 Volodymyr Shuba became the prosecutor of Crimea. From the beginning of 1997 the number of grave crimes was greatly decreased. 
During the period of 2011 – 2014 for almost three years Vyacheslav Pavlov was the prosecutor of Crimea when in March 2014 the troops of Russian Federation broke the borders of the peninsula and declared so-called referendum of self-determination of Crimea. On March 18, 2014 the so-called "Act of the joining of Crimea and Sevastopol to the Russian Federation" was signed in Kremlin. The Western countries do not accept Crimea annexation and they provide numerous sanctions against Russia. 
The 20 February 2014 was officially declared the date of Crimean occupation by the Verkhovna Rada of Ukraine . Because of the occupation of the peninsula by Russian Federation the prosecutor's office of the Autonomous Republic of Crimea was temporarily relocated to Kyiv.
In Ukraine, there was an "unconstitutional seizure of power by radical nationalists with the support of armed gangs," and in this situation, the Supreme Council "assumes full responsibility for the fate of the Crimea." The Parliament of the Autonomous Republic of Crimea adopted a decision to hold a referendum in Crimea on "matters of improving the status and powers" of the region, which was supposed to raise the issue: "The Autonomous Republic of Crimea has state independence and is part of Ukraine on the basis of treaties and agreements (for or against)."
Following the referendum on March 16, 2017 and the Declaration of Independence adopted on March 11, the Crimean Parliament proclaimed an independent Republic of Crimea, in which Sevastopol has a special status, and asked the Russian Federation to accept the Republic of Crimea as Russia's new constituent entity with the status of the republic. With a similar appeal, the Sevastopol City Council.
On March 18, Russia and the Crimea signed in the St. George's Hall of the Kremlin an agreement on the admission of the Republic of Crimea to the Russian Federation, according to which new subjects of the Federation - the Republic of Crimea and the city of federal significance - were formed within Russia. The document was signed by Russian President Vladimir Putin, Chairman of the State Council of Crimea Vladimir Konstantinov, Chairman of the Council of Ministers of the Crimea Sergey Aksyonov and the head of Sevastopol Alexei Chaly.

From 29 August 2014 till 19 August 2016 the position of the prosecutor of the AR of Crimea was occupied by Vasyl Sinchuk. After this on August 22, 2016 the Prosecutor General of Ukraine appointed Gyunduz Mamedov to this position.
In September 2016 the structure of the Prosecution of Crimea had been reformed, the staff increased, and some of its departments have been relocated to Kherson since the Crimean Department of Security Service of Ukraine is located there.
These realities force the Prosecution to increase its efforts mostly to renewal of justice and prosecution of those responsible for illegal occupation of the Crimean peninsula and for violation of the rights and freedoms of Ukrainian citizens living there.

The main priorities of the Prosecution's work for now are the investigations of crimes against the National Security and the war crimes.

Structure 
 Prosecutor of the Autonomous Republic of Crimea;
 First Deputy Prosecutor of the Autonomous Republic of Crimea;
 Deputy Prosecutor of the Autonomous Republic of Crimea;
 Department of Personnel;
 Department of organizational and legal support, statistics and Single record of investigations support;
 Division for Supervision over Criminal proceedings:
 Department for Supervision over Compliance with Legislation in criminal proceedings and Anti-Corruption Legislation;
 Department of Supervision over Compliance with Legislation on Security Service, State Fiscal Service and State Border Guard Service of Ukraine;
 Department of Supervision over the Procedural Activities of Preliminary Investigation Bodies and Criminal Court Proceedings:
 Department of investigations;
 Department of Procedural Supervision over Criminal Proceedings and State Accusation Support; 
 Department of Representation of the State and Individual interests in the Court;
 Prosecution Attorneys; 
 Division for Documental Support (acting as a Department);
 Department of Finance and Accounting;
 Department of organizational and technical support;
 Senior Specialists of the State Secrets Defence; 
 Senior Specialists of the Informational and Technical Support; 
 Press-secretary (acting as a Senior Specialist).

Prosecutors of the Autonomous Republic of Crimea

Prosecutors of the Autonomous Soviet Socialist Republic of Crimea
M. I. Poretskiy (1921–1922)
İsmail Firdevs (1922–1923)
Osman Saidovich Diveyev (1923–1924)
Ilya Sergiyovych Bazhyn (1926–1927)
Grigoriy Pavlovych Plinkonos (1930–1932)
Memeth Emir-Saliev (1932–1934)
Kostyantyn Mykolaiovych Monatov (1936–1938)
Oleksiy Pavlovych Kartushenko (1939–1941)
Mykhailo Fedorovych Zolotov (1941)
Feodosii Grygorovych Donchenko (1941-1942)
Mykola Illich Chekalov (1942 – 1945)

Prosecutors of the Crimean Oblast
Mykola Illich Chekalov (1945–1947)
Serhiy Ivanovych Neronov (1947–1949)
Mykola Mykolaiovych Khlamov (1949–1957)
Ilya Ivanovych Konoplev (1957–1964)
Mykola Ivanovych Korneyev (1964–1984)
Zinovii Tesak (1984–1991)

Prosecutors of the Autonomous Republic of Crimea
Zinovii Tesak (1991–1992)
Leonid Izosimov (1992–1993)
Valentyn Kuptsov (1993–1996)
Volodymyr Shuba (1996–2000)
Oleksandr Dobrorez (2000–2003)
Volodymyr Galtsov (2003–2005)
Viktor Shemchuk (2005–2007)
Volodymyr Galtsov (2007)
Viktor Shemchuk (2007)
Oleksii Ugriumov (2007–2008) 
Volodymyr Boiko (2008–2010)
Stepan Molytskii (2010–2011)
Vyacheslav Pavlov (2011–2014)
Vasyl Synchuk (2014–2016)
Gyunduz Mamedov (2016-)

External links
The Prosecutor's office of Autonomous Republic of Crimea
 Law of Ukraine "On Prosecutor's Office"

Politics of Crimea
Judiciary of Ukraine